Dorothy Brown may refer to:

 Dorothy Lavinia Brown (1919–2004), African American surgeon, legislator, and teacher
 Dorothy A. Brown (politician) (born 1953), American lawyer and politician
 Dorothy A. Brown (law professor) (born 1960), American law professor and tax reform advocate
 Diorbhail Nic a' Bhriuthainn (died 1644), Scottish Gaelic poet and songwriter